George Wall (20 February 1885 – June 1962) was an English footballer.

Career 
Born in Boldon Colliery, County Durham, Wall started his career with Boldon Royal Rovers and played for Whitburn and Jarrow before joining Barnsley in 1903. In almost three years with Barnsley, Wall scored 24 league goals at a rate of almost one goal in every three games. In 1906, he transferred to Manchester United and helped them win the 1908 and 1911 league titles, as well as the 1909 FA Cup. He left the club in 1915 because of World War I and joined Oldham Athletic after the war in 1919.

During the First World War George Wall served in the Black Watch Regiment. After the war he was sold to Oldham Athletic for £200. While at Manchester United he had scored 98 goals in 316 games. He then played for two seasons with Oldham, before travelling north of the border to Hamilton Academical. He returned to England to play for Rochdale a year later, but dropped out of league football in 1923, playing for Ashton National and Manchester Ship Canal. He retired in 1927.

Wall also won seven caps for England, scoring two goals.

Personal life 
Wall's brother Thomas was a reserve team player at Manchester United and was killed during the First World War. Wall died in Manchester, aged 77, in June 1962.

Career statistics

Honours

Club 

Manchester United
Football League First Division (2): 1907–08, 1910–11
FA Cup (1): 1908–09

Cowdenbeath

 Eastern League (1): 1916–17

Individual 

 Cowdenbeath Hall of Fame

References

1885 births
1962 deaths
People from The Boldons
Footballers from Tyne and Wear
English footballers
Association football wingers
England international footballers
Barnsley F.C. players
Manchester United F.C. players
Oldham Athletic A.F.C. players
Hamilton Academical F.C. players
Rochdale A.F.C. players
English Football League players
English Football League representative players
British Army personnel of World War I
Black Watch soldiers
Ashton National F.C. players
FA Cup Final players